Aida Najjar (12 December 1938 – 5 February 2020) was a Palestinian-Jordanian writer and researcher.

Life
Najjar was born in Lifta on 12 December 1938. She obtained her bachelor from Cairo University in 1960, the master from the University of Kansas in 1965 and PhD from Syracuse University in 1975. The title of her PhD thesis is The Arabic Press and Nationalism in Palestine, 1920-1948. She worked at United Nations Development Programme (UNDP) and FAO.

Najjar wrote several literary and non-literary books. The most prominent of these books are "Al-Quds and the Shalabiyya girl" and "History of the Palestinian Press".

Death 
On 5 February 2020, Najjar died in Amman.

References

External links

1938 births
2020 deaths
Cairo University alumni
20th-century Palestinian women writers
21st-century Palestinian women writers
Palestinian expatriates in Egypt
Palestinian expatriates in the United States
Palestinian expatriates in Jordan
University of Kansas alumni
Syracuse University alumni
Palestinian refugees
Palestinian emigrants to Jordan
Palestinian sociologists
Palestinian women sociologists
Burials at Sahab Cemetery